Artur Olech (22 June 1940 – 12 August 2010) was a Polish boxer. He was born in Lviv, Ukrainian SSR, Soviet Union and died in Wroclaw, Poland.

Olech won two silver medals at the Olympic Games, in 1964 in Tokyo and 1968 in Mexico City.

1964 Olympic results
Below are the results of Artur Olech who competed for Poland as a flyweight boxer at the 1964 Tokyo Olympics:

 Round of 32: defeated Stefan Panayotov (Bulgaria) on points, 3-2
 Round of 16: defeated John Kamau (Kenya) on points, 5-0
 Quarterfinal: defeated Constantin Ciuca (Romania) on points, 5-0
 Semifinal: defeated Stanislav Sorokin (Soviet Union); Sorokin did not start
 Final: lost to Fernando Atzori (Italy) on points, 1-4 (was awarded silver medal)

References
sports-reference.com
Profile 

1940 births
2010 deaths
Boxers at the 1964 Summer Olympics
Boxers at the 1968 Summer Olympics
Olympic boxers of Poland
Olympic silver medalists for Poland
Olympic medalists in boxing
Sportspeople from Lviv
Ukrainian Soviet Socialist Republic people
Polish male boxers
Medalists at the 1968 Summer Olympics
Medalists at the 1964 Summer Olympics
Flyweight boxers
21st-century Polish people
20th-century Polish people